Beloit may refer to

Places in the United States
Beloit, Alabama
Beloit, Georgia
Beloit, Iowa
Beloit, Kansas
Beloit, Ohio
Beloit, Wisconsin
Beloit (town), Wisconsin, adjacent to the city of Beloit
Beloit Township, Mitchell County, Kansas
South Beloit, Illinois

Other uses
Beloit (corporation), a former American paper machine and other paper making equipment supplier
Beloit College, located in Beloit, Wisconsin
USS Beloit (LCS-29), laid down in 2020

See also